is a Japanese football player.

Career
After attending the Shohei High School, Saso was registered as a special designated player by Omiya Ardija in August 2017.

Club statistics
Updated to 29 August 2018.

References

External links

Profile at J. League
Profile at Omiya Ardija

1999 births
Living people
Association football people from Tokyo
Japanese footballers
J2 League players
Omiya Ardija players
J3 League players
AC Nagano Parceiro players
Association football wingers